In the literatures of India, Pakistan, Bangladesh and Afghanistan, a jangnama is an epic or heroic poem.  The word is of Persian origin.  In Kashmiri, jangnama refers to epic poetry generally; but jangnama also identifies a specific genre of poetry that deals with Islamic conquests.  The genre also exists in many Muslim-influenced Indo-Aryan languages.  A variety of different jangnamas were written in the years before 1850; they include:
 Janganama Zainab's Chautisa by Sheikh Faizullah (16th century)
 Janganama by Dawlat Wazir Bahram Khan (16th century)
 Jangnama Muqtal Husayn by Mohammad Khan Islamabadi (1645)
 Jangnama by Abdul Hakim (1723)
 Zari Jangnama Maharamparba by Heyat Mahmud (1723)
 Qasim-er Lodai O Fatima-r Suratnama by Sherbaz (18th century)
 Shahid-e-Karbala O Sakina-r Bilaap by Zafar (18th century)
 Shongram Husayn by Hamid (18th century)
 Janganama Amir Hamza by Gharibullah
 Jangnama Hanifa (Zaiguner Pathi) by Sayad Hamza
 Jangnama by Radhacaran Gop
 Jangnama by Nasrullah Khan
 Jangnama by Hamid Shah
 Jangnama by Maulvi Ghulam Mastifa
 Jang Ahd by Ahmad Yar
 Jang Badan by Ahmad Yar
 Jangnama Lahore by Khan Singh
 Jangnama Hari Singh by Ram Dayal
 Jangnama Delhi Khazan Singh
 Jangnama Kabul Kandhar by Siam
 Jangnama Kabul by Karam Singh
 Jangnama Khaibar by Mirza Abdul Hamid
 Jang Europe by Havinder Nand Singh
 Jang Chitral by Kahan Singh
 Jang Singhaan te Angrezan by Shah Mohammad
as well as the anonymous Jang Chitral, Jang Chin, Jang Tiraj, and Jang Zaitun. Jangnamahs were also written in more recent times; one example is Jangnamah Europe by a Sikh soldier, Nand Singh, who fought in the First World War.

See also
Dobhashi
Kissa
List of Punjabi-language poets

References

Indian poetry